Pyrocitric is a group of organic chemical compounds pertaining to, or designating, any one of three acids obtained by the distillation of citric acid, and called respectively citraconic, itaconic, and mesaconic acid.

References

External links
 

Citric acid cycle compounds